Powless is the surname of the following people
Delby Powless (born in 1980), Mohawk lacrosse player
Gaylord Powless (1946–2001), Canadian lacrosse player
Neilson Powless (born in 1996), American cyclist
John Powless (1932–2021), American basketball and tennis coach
Johnny Powless (born in 1993), Canadian lacrosse player
Neal Powless, American lacrosse player
Paul Powless (1758–1847), Oneida warrior and chief
Purcell Powless (1925–2010), Oneida tribal chairman
Ross Powless (1926–2003), Mohawk lacrosse player
Shayna Powless (born in 1994), American racing cyclist